Qaleh Gelineh-ye Olya (also Romanized as Qal‘eh Gelīneh-ye ‘Olyā and Qal‘eh-ye Galīneh-ye ‘Olyā; also known as Qal‘eh Gelīneh-ye Bālā) is a village in Sanjabi Rural District, Kuzaran District, Kermanshah County, Kermanshah Province, Iran. At the 2006 census, its population was 79, in 20 families.

References 

Populated places in Kermanshah County